Escapade is the debut studio album by New Zealand musician and founder of Split Enz, Tim Finn. Released in June 1983, the album peaked at number 1 in New Zealand and number 8 in Australia.

At the 1983 Countdown Australian Music Awards the album won Best Australian Album and "Fraction Too Much Friction" won Best Video.

Track listing
Australia and New Zealand

United States
Resequenced track listing with "Below the Belt" replacing "Grand Adventure"

Personnel
Tim Finn - vocals, piano
Additional musicians
Ricky Fataar - drums, percussion, keyboard, backing vocals
Chris Haig - bass
Sam McNally - synthesizer
Mark Moffatt - guitar
Venetta Fields - backing vocals
 Richard Tee - piano on "Fraction Too Much Friction", Rhodes on "In a Minor Key" and "Wait and See"
Amanda Villepastour - synthesizer
Wilbur Wilde - saxophone
Joe Camilleri - saxophone
Peter Cross - trumpet
Vince Gill - mandolin on "Not For Nothing"
Doug Lacey - steel drum on "Grand Adventure"
Phil Scorgie - bass on "Grand Adventure"

Charts

Weekly charts

Year-end charts

References

Tim Finn albums
1983 debut albums
Mushroom Records albums